"How It Feels To Be Colored Me" (1928) is an essay by Zora Neale Hurston published in World Tomorrow as a "white journal sympathetic to Harlem Renaissance writers", illustrating her circumstance as an African-American woman in the early 20th century in America. Most of Hurston's work involved her "Negro" characterization that were so true to reality, that she was known as an excellent anthropologist.

Coming from an all- black community in Eatonville, Florida, she lived comfortably due to her father holding high titles, John Hurston was a local Baptist preacher and the mayor of Eatonville. After the death of her mother in 1904, at the age of thirteen, Hurston was forced to live with relatives in Jacksonville who worked as domestic servants. In her essay Hurston references Jacksonville where she describes that she felt "thrown against a sharp white background". Eatonville and Jacksonville became the main influential settings for her essay "How it Feels To Be Colored Me" and her novel Their Eyes Were Watching God. In both writings Hurston begins to investigate the true meaning of individuality and personality, through the usage of anecdotes, imagery, tone, and figurative language. Hurston's writings allow the reader to understand "personal expression to the arena of public discourse without losing the ties to their home cultures and languages"

Summary 

Hurston begins the essay about her childhood in the town of Eatonville, Florida. She describes watching white people from her front porch, and dances and sings for them in return for money. Hurston becomes comfortable with her surroundings in the small town of Eatonville. At the age of thirteen her mother passes away and Hurston was sent away to leave her home in Jacksonville to attend a boarding school. At this point, Hurston is referred to as just another “colored girl.” She then elaborates how Eatonville was a safe zone for her since it was considered a “colored town”. As time progressed, she realized the differences between herself and others surrounding her, like her skin and the different personalities in her friends. She begins to feel a sense of isolation and loneliness. Although, Hurston claims that she does not consider herself "tragically colored" but a regular human being, "At times I have no race, I am just me". She mentions her experience at a jazz club with a white friend, where through the music she expresses the racial differences and distance between their lives. She concludes her essay acknowledging the difference but refuses the idea of separation. "I have no separate feeling about being an American citizen and colored". She explains that if the racial roles were reversed, and blacks discriminated against whites, the outcome is the same for a white person’s experience amongst black people. In her final paragraph, she compares herself to a brown paper bag filled with random bits, just as everyone around her is a different colored paper bag filled with different small bits and pieces that make each unique. Hurston concludes that every race is essential and special to the "Great Stuffer of Bags". She encourages one not to focus on race, but one’s self-awareness and the similarities we all have in common.

References 

1928 essays
American essays
Works by Zora Neale Hurston